Damon L. Allen (born July 29, 1963) is a former professional quarterback who played in the Canadian Football League (CFL). He is currently fourth in all-time professional football passing yards and second in all-time CFL passing yards after he was surpassed for first place by the Montréal Alouettes' Anthony Calvillo on October 10, 2011. Allen retired as professional football's all-time leading passer with 72,381 passing yards after he surpassed Warren Moon's total of 70,553 yards (in both the CFL and NFL combined) on September 4, 2006 in the annual Labour Day Classic. He also retired in third place in all-time CFL rushing yards with 11,920 yards, behind Mike Pringle and George Reed. The 2007 season marked Allen's twenty-third season in the CFL and he officially announced his retirement on May 28, 2008 at age 44. Allen is the younger brother of Pro Football Hall of Famer Marcus Allen.

Allen has been mentioned as one of the greatest CFL quarterbacks of all time after winning four Grey Cups with three different teams. He also was a three time Grey Cup MVP. In 2005, he was the CFL Most Outstanding Player at 42 years old, becoming the second oldest MVP of any North American sports franchise (oldest is Gordie Howe of the Houston Aeros of the World Hockey Association, MVP at age 46 in 1974). He was a formidable passer and rusher, as he retired only 323 rushing yards behind his brother Marcus. In 2012, he was elected into the Canadian Football Hall of Fame.

In May 2010, Allen launched the Damon Allen Quarterback Academy, in which he personally teaches the skills and strategies of quarterbacking to students of all ages and skill levels.

Personal life
Damon has three daughters and a son. They live in Oakville, Ontario. Damon is employed as special assistant to the General Manager of the Toronto Argonauts.

Early years

Allen started playing football by the age of six for Valencia Park's Pop Warner in San Diego. Allen played safety on defense. In the Junior Peewee league, in his first year as a quarterback, Allen's team won the championships. This was followed by  two undefeated seasons, and winning the Junior Peewee league title for three years in a row.

High school

In high school, Allen was a fine two sport athlete. In football he was the starting quarterback at Lincoln High School. He had a 22-2 record as starting quarterback at Lincoln High. Allen was a first team all-CIF player and Tribune Athlete of the Year. He led his team to consecutive 2A Division CIF Football Championships In baseball, Allen was a pitcher with a record of 14-2, and his Lincoln High baseball team was rated #1 in San Diego County with a record of 24-4. He was a First team All-CIF Utility Man which also made him Tribune Athlete of the Year in his senior year.

College career
Damon went on to play college football for California State University, Fullerton. There, Allen led the Titans to two Pacific Coast Athletic Association (PCAA) championships. He also broke a 26-year-old NCAA record throwing only three passes that were intercepted, in over 300 attempts and broke seven school records. He was a first team PCAA quarterback, and was named the UPI All West Coast team quarterback along with UNLV's Randall Cunningham.

Allen was sixteenth in overall voting for the 1984 Heisman Trophy. He also played in the Senior Bowl college All-Star game (completing 6 for 8 passes for 50 yards, 1 touchdown, and rushing for 20 yards on 3 carries).

Allen was not only an outstanding football player, he was also a superior baseball player. He helped his Titans' baseball team win the 1984 College World Series, leading his team to a regular season record of 66-20 as a pitcher. He was drafted by the Detroit Tigers in the 1984 Major League Baseball Draft in the seventh round, the same year the Tigers won the Major League Baseball World Series. Allen never signed a professional, major league baseball contract with the Tigers, but did sign one with the Pittsburgh Pirates in 1993. Allen reported to the Pirates' spring training camp in 1994, but ultimately left their camp and decided to play in the Canadian Football League.

College career statistics

Professional career

Edmonton Eskimos
Allen joined the CFL as a free-agent in 1985, signed by the Edmonton Eskimos, and threw for 661 yards and three touchdowns in his rookie season as a back-up to Matt Dunigan. In the 1987 season, Allen played in the Grey Cup championship game, replacing the injured starter Dunigan, and led the Eskimos to a Grey Cup victory, defeating the Toronto Argonauts 38-36, at Vancouver's BC Place Stadium. His first Grey Cup win, Allen earned Grey Cup Most Valuable Player honours in the championship.

Ottawa Rough Riders
In 1989, Allen signed with the Ottawa Rough Riders. In 1991, Allen was named an Eastern Division All-Star for the first time in his CFL career.  During the 1991 season, Allen rushed for a career-high 1,036 yards and 8 touchdowns in 18 games, and passed for a then career-high 4,275 yards with 24 touchdowns.

Hamilton Tiger-Cats
In 1992, Allen signed with the Hamilton Tiger-Cats. In 18 games, Allen threw for 3,858 and 19 touchdowns, and rushed for 850 yards and 7 touchdowns, in his only season in "Steeltown." After the 1992 season, Allen was traded to the Edmonton Eskimos.

Edmonton Eskimos
In 1993, in his second time around with Edmonton, Allen helped the Eskimos to victory in the Grey Cup game, winning his second title, and was named Grey Cup Most Valuable Player in a 33-23 win over the Winnipeg Blue Bombers. In 1994, Allen led the Esks to the Western Division Semi-Finals, only to lose to the BC Lions.

Memphis Mad Dogs
In 1995, Allen signed as a free-agent with the Memphis Mad Dogs. He appeared in 15 games with the CFL expansion team, and threw for 3,211 yards and 11 touchdowns on 228 of 390 passing. Allen also rushed for 427 yards in his only professional season in the United States.

BC Lions
In 1996, Allen joined the BC Lions.

In 1999, Allen was voted to the CFL's West Division All-Star team. He threw for 4,219 yards on 315 of 521 passing with 22 touchdowns, ran the ball 136 times for 785 yards and 8 touchdowns, and threw for more than 300 yards on five occasions.

In 2000, Allen became the CFL's all-time leading passer on October 28 against Hamilton, throwing for 345 yards to surpass Ron Lancaster's previous record of 50,535 yards. Allen completed 324 of 525 passes (61.7%) to lead the CFL with a career-high 4,840 passing yards. Allen was nominated as the Lions' Most Outstanding Player at the CFL Player Awards. Allen captured his first Grey Cup with the Lions (third of his career) throwing for 234 yards in a win over the Montreal Alouettes.

Toronto Argonauts
In 2003, after the acquisition of Dave Dickenson as their new quarterback, the 39-year-old Allen was traded from the BC Lions to the Toronto Argonauts for a second-round draft pick in the 2004 CFL Draft, and a third-round pick in the 2005 CFL Draft. Allen's Argonaut re-debut was a 20-18 season- opening loss to the Saskatchewan Roughriders that also marked Allen's 300th regular season game of his CFL career. In Week 7, Allen became only the third quarterback in professional football history to pass for 60,000 yards against his former club, the BC Lions. In a Week 17 loss to the Ottawa Renegades, Allen completed 20 of 39 pass attempts for 203 yards, with 2 interceptions and 1 touchdown, giving Allen 334 career touchdown passes, and surpassing Ron Lancaster for the most career touchdown passes in CFL history. Allen would lead the Argos to the Eastern Division Final that year as well.

In Week 9 of the 2004 season versus Montreal, Allen exited the game in the third quarter with a fractured left tibia, and spent Weeks 10-16 on the injured reserve roster. There was considerable concern that Allen, at 41 years of age, would never come back from such a severe injury, but he did. In Week 17, Allen dressed as the third quarterback (behind Michael Bishop and Romaro Miller) for a game against the BC Lions. In Week 18, Allen dressed as the backup quarterback behind Michael Bishop and entered the game versus the Calgary Stampeders at the end of the second quarter. Allen completed his first thirteen pass attempts, making him the second quarterback in Argonaut history (Mike Rae, 17 of 17 versus Montreal, August 12, 1975) to complete more than 12 passes consecutively in a game. Allen finished the game with 18 of 23 pass completions, and his 82.6% completion percentage ranks fourth in Argo history for a single game.

In the 2004 Grey Cup Championship against the BC Lions, Allen was named Grey Cup Most Valuable Player for third time in his legendary career. Allen led the Argos to their fifteenth Grey Cup Championship and won his fourth championship. Allen finished the game with 23 of 34 pass completions for 299 yards (longest gain, 34 yards) and 1 touchdown pass, and rushed 5 times for 10 yards (longest gain, 5 yards) and 2 rushing touchdowns.

Allen continued his assault on the record books during the 2005 CFL season. On October 27, 2005, Damon reached the 5,000-yard passing plateau for the first time in his 21-year CFL career by posting a 34-11 victory against the Hamilton Tiger-Cats. The win guaranteed Toronto a first-place finish in the CFL East plus home field advantage in the playoffs. The game took place before 40,085 fans; the largest crowd for a CFL game in Toronto since 1992. However, the Argonauts were defeated 33-17 in the 2005 East Final by the Montreal Alouettes, thereby thwarting their hopes of repeating their 2004 Grey Cup win.

In 2005, Allen won his first CFL's Outstanding Player Award. In that year, he also hosted the inaugural "Damon Allen Quarterback Challenge" which featured top CFL quarterbacks participating in various skill competitions. In the Quarterback Challenge's second year, Allen won the event.

In 2006, Allen started the opening home game of the season against the Hamilton Tiger-Cats and broke the middle finger on his right hand on Toronto's third play. Allen was injured trying to break his fall after taking a late hit from Hamilton safety Wayne Shaw, who was penalized on the play. Allen missed nearly a month and a half of action with a broken finger, returning on July 29 vs. the BC Lions.

On September 4, 2006, at the Labour Day Classic against the Hamilton Tiger-Cats, Allen broke Warren Moon's record (70,553 yards) to become professional football's all-time passing leader. The record-setting completion, a 29-yard shovel pass to wide receiver Arland Bruce III, took place at 5:02 of the third quarter. The game was suspended briefly for a presentation by CFL Commissioner Tom Wright. Allen's triumphant pose with the record-breaking football was captured by a photographer and later released by the Argos as a commemorative poster on their website.

In November 2006, Allen was voted one of the CFL's Top 50 players (#14) of the league's modern era by Canadian sports network The Sports Network/TSN.

On January 18, 2007, Allen underwent successful surgery to repair the middle finger of his (right) throwing hand and was back in the gym training, in less than 24 hours.

On February 28, 2007, Allen re-signed a contract with the Argonauts for one year plus an option .

Allen started the 2007 season as the Argos starting quarterback beating out Michael Bishop and former NFL starter Mike McMahon. However, he was replaced in the third quarter of the first game by Bishop despite having gone 14-18, 130 yards and a touchdown. Allen was then bumped down to third on the depth chart. However, after Bishop went down with a wrist injury and McMahon failed to impress, Allen stepped into the starting role once again. However, in his first game back as starter he injured his toe. Allen was placed on the nine-game injured list and Rocky Butler took over as the Argos starting quarterback

Allen announced that his retirement as a player on May 28, 2008, but will stay with the Argos as a special advisor to CEO Pinball Clemons.

Post-retirement
In 2018, Allen was inducted into Canada's Sports Hall of Fame.

Career statistics

References

External links

 

1963 births
Living people
African-American players of American football
African-American players of Canadian football
American football quarterbacks
BC Lions players
Cal State Fullerton Titans football players
Canadian Football Hall of Fame inductees
Canadian Football League Most Outstanding Player Award winners
Canadian football quarterbacks
Edmonton Elks players
Hamilton Tiger-Cats players
Memphis Mad Dogs players
Ottawa Rough Riders players
Players of American football from San Diego
Players of Canadian football from San Diego
Toronto Argonauts players